Gol Kheyrak may refer to:
 Gol Kheyrak-e Olya
 Gol Kheyrak-e Sofla